W22CH, UHF analog channel 22, was a low-powered TBN owned-and-operated television station licensed to Hopkinsville, Kentucky, United States. The station was owned by the Trinity Broadcasting Network. W22CH's transmitter was located near the junction of KY 91 and Eagle Way (KY 1682) on Hopkinsville's west end.

History 
The station signed on the air on December 15, 1987 as W62BH to become the third (fourth all-time) locally-based television outlet to serve the Hopkinsville area. For its first 15 years on the air, the station broadcast on UHF channel 62. Hopkinsville was also home to two other now-defunct low-powered stations, including America One affiliate W43AG (later WKAG-CA) and Kentucky Educational Television-owned W57AJ (later W64AV), a translator of Madisonville-based WKMA-TV. The area was also served by full-powered UHF station WNKJ-TV, but it was shut down due to financial issues.

In 2002, the station's analog signal was reallocated to UHF channel 22, and changing the call letters to W22CH in the process.

In 2010, TBN closed down many of its low-powered repeaters, including W22CH, due to ongoing economic problems. This was also due in part of the rise in digital over-the-air television. The license for W22CH was surrendered to the FCC in early or mid-2011 as per the rule that low-power stations that have been off the air for more than a calendar year would have their license canceled. TBN service remains available on cable and satellite television providers nationwide. Hendersonville, Tennessee-licensed full-power TBN O&O WPGD-TV also has presence in the area as that station's digital signal barely reaches the Hopkinsville area. With the 2011 shutdown of WKAG-CA, WCKV-LD in nearby Clarksville, Tennessee is the only locally-based commercial television station in the area, with most of the Nashville area's full-powered stations, including WPGD, available over-the-air and on cable and satellite providers as Hopkinsville is part of the Nashville DMA. The only other full-power station receivable over-the-air in the area is KET satellite station WKMA-TV.

References

Hopkinsville, Kentucky
22CH
Television channels and stations established in 1987
1987 establishments in Kentucky
Television channels and stations disestablished in 2010
2010 establishments in Kentucky
Defunct television stations in the United States
22CH